The 2009–2010 Jordanian Pro League (known as the Al-Manaseer Jordanian Pro League, named after Ziad AL-Manaseer Companies Group for sponsorship reasons) was the 58th season of the top-flight football in Jordan.The league has been expanded from the previous season and now features 12 clubs, up two from the previous 10.Al-Faisaly won its 31 title.

Teams

Map

Managerial Changes

Final league table

Fixtures and results

References

2003
Jordan
1